Mbanza-Ngungu, formerly known as Thysville or Thysstad, named after Albert Thys, is a city and territory in Kongo Central Province in the western part of the Democratic Republic of Congo, lying on a short branch off the Matadi-Kinshasa Railway. It has a population of nearly 100,000 people.

Overview

Formerly known as a resort town, it is home to the Thysville Caves, which encompass the entire range of the colourless African blind barb.  It is home to a major FARDC garrison: the 1st Armoured Brigade was based here during the early 1990s period. The 1st Armoured Brigade was first listed in the IISS Military Balance in 1982-83 edition, implying that the brigade may have been created during that period. The city's other main industry is railway engineering.

The city is currently the main site of Kongo University.

Notable people
 

Daniel Mukoko Samba (born 1959), politician

Gallery 
Swiss photographer  Annemarie Schwarzenbach, took photos from May 1941 until March 1942. They are shown below.

See also 
 List of railway stations in the Democratic Republic of the Congo
 Tintin in the Congo

References 

Populated places in Kongo Central